Lydia Fox may refer to

Lydia Fox, a fictional character in the PBS Kids television show, Arthur
Lydia Fox (born 1979), English actress